Wormwood Live is a 1999 live album by the Residents. Recorded in Germany, it features the full live performance of songs from their album, Wormwood: Curious Stories from the Bible.  Studio versions of the live performances were later released as Roadworms: The Berlin Sessions.  This live album was released by Ralph America in a limited edition of 1200 copies.

Track listing 
 "In the Beginning"
 "Welcome to Wormwood"
 "Mr. Skull's Rave: 1"
 "How to Get a Head"
 "Mr. Misery"
 "Tent Peg in the Temple"
 "Mr. Skull's Rave: 2"
 "God's Magic Finger"
 "Dinah and the Unclean Skin"
 "Cain and Abel"
 "Mr. Skull's Rave: 3"
 "Burn Baby Burn"
 "Fire Fall"
 "King of Kings"
 "Skull Prayer"
 "Mr. Skull's Rave: 4"
 "Abraham"
 "Bridegroom of Blood"
 "Mr. Skull's Rave: 5"
 "David"
 "Judas Saves"
 "Old Time Religion (Epilogue)"
 "Jesus Loves Me (Exit Music)"

References

1999 live albums
The Residents live albums